Ladislav František Čelakovský (December 3, 1863 – December 31, 1916) was a Czech mycologist and botanist born in Prague. He was the son of botanist Ladislav Josef Čelakovský (1834-1902).

Čelakovský was a professor of plant physiology at the Czech Technical University in Prague, and was a specialist in research of slime molds. He was the author of an 1890 book on the phylum Myxomycota called České myxomycety.

References 
 This article is based on a translation of an article from the German and Czech Wikipedia.

Czech botanists
Czech mycologists
1863 births
1916 deaths
Scientists from Prague
Academic staff of Czech Technical University in Prague